The FBA 10 was a reconnaissance flying boat built in France in the early 1920s.

Development
The FBA 10 was a two-seat biplane flying boat of all-wood construction.

Specifications

References

1910s international military reconnaissance aircraft
1910s French military reconnaissance aircraft
FBA aircraft
Flying boats
Biplanes
1920s French patrol aircraft
Aircraft first flown in 1922